Sivatirtha Matha a Hindu Matha (monastery) in the outskirts of old town of Bhubaneswar, Odisha, India, and is known for Chandan Yatra and Dola purnima. Dola Purnima is celebrated in the belief that Lord Lingaraja arrives to this Matha to take pankti bhogo (community lunch) on Dola Purnima.

Location 
The matha faces east and is located in the Rathagada Chowk, Old Town, Bhubaneswar. One can approach this monastery on the right side of the Ratha road leading from Lingaraj temple to Mausima temple at a distance of 30 meters from the northern gateway of Lingaraja. The Endowment Commission took over the matha in 1970.  The Matha belonged to Sankaracharya Sampradaya. The wooden logs used for preparing the chariot of Lord Lingaraj are consecrated here in the monastery before used by the carpenters.

Burial temples of Sivatirtha matha

The temples are located within the Matha precinct in the eastern end. The matha is situated in front of the northern entrance of Lingaraj temple across the Ratha road. There are thirteen burial temples arranged in one and half rows. In the rear row there are nine temples, of which four temples from the northern side have been encroached upon by a private compound wall. The temples on the south are partially buried. Of the four temples in the front row three are buried up to the gandi while the fourth one is buried up to the bada. The burial temples are square on plan. On elevation these temples are of pidha order having bada, gandi and mastaka. The gandi of these temples have three receding tiers.

See also
 List of temples in Bhubaneswar

Bibliography 
 Lesser Known Monuments of Bhubaneswar by Dr. Sadasiba Pradhan

External links
 http://www.orissa.gov.in/e-magazine/Orissareview/2008/July-2008/engpdf/75_The_Role_of_Mathas.pdf

Shiva temples in Odisha
Hindu temples in Bhubaneswar
Archaeological monuments in Odisha